TX Camelopardalis (abbreviated TX Cam) is a Mira-type variable star in the constellation Camelopardalis. It is a classical long period variable star with pulsational period of 558.7 days. Water masers have been observed around the star.

References

Camelopardalis (constellation)
Mira variables
Camelopardalis, TX
M-type giants